Transcription factor AP-2 delta (activating enhancer binding protein 2 delta), also known as TFAP2D, is a human gene. The protein encoded by this gene is a transcription factor.

See also
 Activating protein 2

References

External links
 

Transcription factors